Mongolia participated in the 2002 Asian Games held in Busan, South Korea, from September 29 to October 14, 2002. Athletes from Mongolia won overall 14 medals (including one gold), and clinched 26th spot in the medal table.

Medal summary

Medals by sport

Medalists

Boxing

Judo

Shooting

Wrestling

References

Nations at the 2002 Asian Games
2002
Asian Games